Portuguese Venezuelans (or Luso-Venezuelans) are Portuguese-born citizens with Venezuelan citizenship or Venezuelan-born citizens of Portuguese ancestry or citizenship. Mostly located in Caracas, Valencia and Maracaibo, also Barquisimeto, the Portuguese community of Venezuela are among the largest ethnic groups in the country. The State of Portuguesa takes its name from the Portuguesa River, in which a Portuguese women is said to have drowned.

Portuguese arrived to Venezuela in the early and middle 20th century, as immigrants, mostly from Madeira Island. Venezuela has the second largest Portuguese diaspora in America, after Brazil. There is strong interest among a large segment of the Portuguese in Venezuela to preserve the culture and familial bond with the old country Portugal, while they have been important in the development of Venezuela holding a substantial number of businesses in the retail trade. The Portuguese language in Venezuela influences Venezuelan Spanish with some neologisms and loanwords.

Notable Portuguese Venezuelans
Danny Alves, footballer
Nico Castel, lyric singer
Vanessa Gonçalves, Miss Venezuela 2010
Laura Gonçalves, Miss Portugal 2011
Marjorie de Sousa, model and actress
Osmel Sousa, Miss Venezuela president (born in Cuba)
Fernando de Ornelas, former footballer
Leonardo Jardim, football manager
Lance dos Ramos, actor, model and animator
Kimberly dos Ramos, actress, model and singer
Catherine Joy Perry, Competes as Lana in WWE - professional wrestling valet, actress, model and singer (born in Florida, United States)
La Divaza, Internet personality

See also
Portuguesa (state)#Etymology
Portuguesa River

References

 
European Venezuelan
Venezuela